Peter John Thomson (born 25 April 1965) is a Canadian rally race car driver with Thomson Motorsport, and a venture capitalist.

Life and family
Thomson is the younger son of the late Kenneth Thomson, 2nd Baron Thomson of Fleet of the Thomson Corporation, and the younger brother of David Thomson, 3rd Baron Thomson of Fleet. Thomson and his wife, Diana, have one child. 

He began rally racing in 1986. Races won by Thomson include:
 Participated in WRC Corona Rally, Mexico 2006
 Canadian National Champions  2005
 Ontario National Champions 2005
 North American Rally Cup Group N Champions 2003
 Ontario Performance Rally Champions 2003
 1st at 2002 Silverstone Black Bear Rally
 1st in Group N at 2002 STPR Rally

References

External links
 Team Thomson – Racing
 Thomvest – Venture Capital

Peter
1965 births
Living people
Businesspeople from Toronto
Canadian people of English descent
Canadian people of Scottish descent
Canadian rally drivers
Sportspeople from Toronto
Younger sons of barons